Julio Cesar Pino is a former tenured Associate Professor of History at Kent State University in Kent, Ohio, specializing in Latin American History and the Third World. He was fired in April 2018. He is a Fulbright Scholar and a member of Phi Beta Kappa. His courses include "Comparative Third World Revolutions", Afro-Latin America, History of Women in Latin America" and "The Sixties: A Third World View."

In 1997 he published "Family and Favela: the Reproduction of Poverty in Rio de Janeiro" (Greenwood Press), dealing with household organization and the feminization of poverty in the Rio shantytowns. He is the author of numerous articles in Latin American Research Review, Journal of Urban History, Latin American Perspectives and other journals. Dr. Pino also has a deep interest in pedagogy, and has published articles in "The History Teacher" and "Perspectives" magazine of the American Historical Association. His current research project is a study of nineteenth-century African Muslim slaves and free persons in Brazil. Dr. Pino is listed in Who's Who in American Education and Who's Who in America. He is a Contributing Editor of Latin American Perspectives.  He is also engaged in a study of the historiography of working women in Latin America from pre-colonization to globalization.

Dr. Pino's writings on Third World shantytowns have been published and cited in critical reference works such as Africana: The Encyclopedia of the African and African American Experience (DuBois Center: Harvard University) and Encyclopedia of Third World Poverty. His books and articles are regularly taught in courses, from women's studies to urban history, at leading universities in the United States, Europe and Latin America.

Biography
Julio Cesar Pino was born in Havana, Cuba in 1960. He moved to Los Angeles with his family in 1968. 

He received his Ph.D in History from the University of California, Los Angeles in 1991.

Political controversies
Pino has been involved in a long series of anti-Semitic controversies relating to American foreign policy, Islam, suicide bombing, jihad, and Israel. These include a 2012 newspaper column praising the actions of the terrorist who carried out the Kiryat Yovel supermarket bombing, and a letter critical of American policy that read, in part, "You attack, and continue to attack, us everywhere... The ill done to the Muslim nations must be requited." In 2011 he was investigated by the Secret Service after calling president Bush a "cocaine cowboy."  In November 2007, Kent State demoted the chair of the history department for failing to follow procedure when it authorized a fully paid, mid-semester, 6-week trip to the United Arab Emirates where Pino wished to study Arabic.  Pino was recalled to his teaching post before completing the 6 weeks. In 2011 a public controversy ensued after Pino shouted "Death to Israel" during a talk given at Kent State by Ishmael Khaldi, an Israeli diplomat.  University President Lester Lefton condemned Pino's behavior as "reprehensible, and an embarrassment to our university," defending Pino's right to free speech but finding his behavior, "deplorable." Pino has been involved in a series of anti-Israel and anti-Semitic actions, writing an open  letter in 2014 asserting of Israeli Jews that, "The Chosen drain the blood of innocents."

2016 FBI investigation

Julio Pino returned to the headlines in January 2016 when information surfaced that the FBI was interviewing students and professors for possible ties between Pino and ISIS. Pino denied the allegations against him in an email to Inside Higher Ed, saying, "My only commitment is to serve my students as guided by the light of knowledge. I have no ties to any political organization, nor do I recruit for any cause." A university spokesperson confirmed that he is still teaching at this time. Kent State said in a statement that it is cooperating with an ongoing investigation, and said the FBI had assured it there was no threat to the campus. Pino said neither the FBI nor Homeland Security has notified him of any sort of investigation.

2018 charges
Pino was charged in April 2018 by federal prosecutors with one count of making false statements to law enforcement, relative to a separate 2016 investigation into his connections with a man in St. Louis who had threatened a family court judge. Pino plead guilty to the charges, with a plea agreement for a prison term between 10 and 16 months. He is scheduled to be sentenced on August 23. He stated that he had already planned to retire from the university at the conclusion of the Spring 2018 semester.

References

External links

1960 births
Living people
People from Van Nuys, Los Angeles
People from Kent, Ohio
Cuban emigrants to the United States
University of California, Los Angeles alumni
Bowdoin College faculty
Kent State University faculty
Converts to Islam
Cuban Muslims
American Muslims
Fulbright alumni